Gandhada Gudi is a 1973 Indian Kannada-language action drama film directed by Vijay and produced by M. P. Shankar. Rajkumar in his 150th film  portrays an honest forest officer Kumar while Vishnuvardhan plays the antagonist, Anand, though his character is redeemed at the end of the film. Kalpana, M. P. Shankar, Narasimharaju and Balakrishna performed other important roles.

It was the first Indian movie made on the concept of protection of forests and wildlife conservation. It is the only movie in which Rajkumar and Vishnuvardhan appeared together. The film was seen as a milestone in the career of Rajkumar. The movie became a blockbuster and saw a theatrical run of 25 weeks.

This movie was reported to be the first mainstream Indian film on forest conservation.
It was the time when CITES – 1973 Convention on International Trade in Endangered Species of Wild Fauna and Flora was signed. CITES aimed to reduce the economic incentive to poach endangered species and destroy their habitat by closing off the international market.The movie was praised for portraying the rich bio diversity of the state of Karnataka.

The movie was remade in Hindi in 1979 as Kartavya. The grand success of this movie prompted NTR to work on a script based on the forest backdrop leading to the 1977 Telugu movie Adavi Ramudu. The movie was dubbed in Malayalam in 1974 as Chandana Kaadu. The success of Gandhada Gudi led to a sequel in 1995 titled Gandhada Gudi Part 2 starring Shiva Rajkumar.

Plot
 
Kumar is an IFS officer, who arrives at the Nagarhole National forest on a mission to protect the natural resources. His main rival is a poacher named Anand, who is actually Kumar's long-lost brother. Anand has been kidnapped and raised by Raja Venkatappa Nayaka to exact vengeance on his father, which is unknown to Anand. After many hurdles, Anand holds his mother and asks Kumar not to interfere or that he will set fire to the forest, but Kumar shoots Anand, fatally injuring him. Venkatappa arrives and reveals about Anand's origin and his plan to use him take vengeance on his family. Venkatappa tries to kill Kumar, but Anand kills him and dies on his mother's lap. After the mission, Kumar receives a bravery award for defending the forest against the poachers.

Cast

Production
The film has brilliant cinematography of the Nagarhole and Bandipur forest in Mysore which is the seat of the royal family of Karnataka. The entire cast has given excellent dimensions to their role.
	
During the shooting of the film where Vishuarvadan's character "shoots" Rajkumar's character's mother, the prop gun was accidentally switched to a real gun. Prabakaran, a forest ranger who realised someone took the gun, ran to the shooting spot to avert untoward incident. Just as Vishnuvardhan was about to pull the trigger, Prabakaran begged for him to stop. The incident caused trauma for Vishuvardan who got death threats from Rajkumar fans . Despite this, both Rajkumar and Vishuvardhan remained on good terms afterwards.

Soundtrack

Music for the film and soundtracks were composed by the duo Rajan–Nagendra.

Reception
The title song, filmed on Karnataka and Kannada is still popular among the Kannadigas. The song can be heard even today on any festival or function in Karnataka.

Sequel

The sequel to Gandhada Gudi had Shiva Rajkumar in the role of a forest officer who is posted in the same forest where his father has created a history. His character now has to carry his father's mission and protect the forest. Many considered the sequel to be a disappointment when compared to the legacy of the original.

Legacy
The film which speaks about the preservation of forests inspired other Kannada films – Jayasimha, Mrugalaya and Maasti Gudi. Also Gandhada Gudi is the first Indian movie made on the concept of forest conservation.

See also
 Bandipur National Park
 Nagarhole National Park

References

External links
 

1973 films
1970s Kannada-language films
1970s action drama films
Kannada films remade in other languages
Films scored by Rajan–Nagendra
Films set in forests
Indian action drama films
1973 drama films
Films directed by Vijay (director)